Red is a nickname of the following people:

Arts and entertainment 
 Red Allen (1906–1967), American jazz trumpeter
 Red Allen (bluegrass) (1930–1993), American bluegrass singer and guitarist
 Red Balaban (1929–2013), American jazz tubist
 Red Buttons (1919–2006), American actor, songwriter, and comedian
 Red Callender (1916–1992), American jazz tubist and double-bassist
 Red Canzian (born 1951), Italian rock singer-songwriter and bassist
 Red Foley (1910–1968), American country music singer and musician
 Red Garland (1923–1984), American jazz pianist
 Red Grammer (born 1952), American folk singer-songwriter and guitarist
 Red Grooms (born 1937), American artist
 Mick Hucknall (born 1960), English singer and songwriter
 Red Ingle (1906–1965), American comedy musician
 Creadel "Red" Jones (1940–1994), American soul singer and musician
 Red Kelly (musician) (1927–2004), American jazz double-bassist
 Red Lane (1939–2015), American singer-songwriter
 Red Mitchell (1927–1992), American jazz double-bassist, composer, lyricist and poet
 Red Murrell (1921–2001), American Western swing musician
 Red Nichols (1905–1965), American jazz cornettist
 Red Norvo (1908–1999), American jazz vibraphonist
 Red Prysock (1926–1993), American rhythm and blues saxophonist
 Red Rodney (1927–1994), American jazz trumpet player
 Red Shea (guitarist) (1938–2008), Canadian folk guitarist
 Red Simpson (1934–2016), American country singer-songwriter
 Red Skelton (1913–1997), American comedian and artist
 Arthur Lee "Red" Smiley (1925–1972), American country and bluegrass musician
 Red Sovine (1917–1980), American country singer-songwriter
 Red Symons (born 1949), Australian television entertainer and former musician with the Skyhooks
 Red West (1936–2017), American actor, stunt performer, and songwriter
 Red Wilson (musician) (1920–2005), American fiddler

Sports 
Sports commentators and writers are listed in the media section.
 Red Adams (1921–2017), American baseball player, scout and coach
 Red Ames (1882–1936), American baseball pitcher
 Red Auerbach (1917–2006), American basketball coach and executive
 Red Baldwin (1894–1956), American baseball player
 Red Ballantyne, Scottish footballer
 Red Barron (1900–1982), American football and baseball player
 Red Berenson (born 1939), Canadian ice hockey player and coach
 Earl Blaik (1897–1989), American football player and coach, college athletics administrator and Army officer
 Red Borom (1915–2011), American baseball player
 Red Bowser (1881–1943), American baseball player
 Red Bryant (born 1984), American football player
 Red Byron (1915–1960), American racing driver
 Chris Cagle (American football) (1905–1942), American football player
 Howie Camp (1893–1960), American baseball player
 Red Cashion (1931–2019), American football official
 Red Causey (1893–1960), American baseball pitcher
 Red Conkright (1914–1980), American football player and coach
 Red Connally (1863–1896), American baseball player
 Red Corriden (1887–1959), American baseball player, coach, and manager 
 Red Corzine (1909–2003), American football player
 Red Davis (1915–2002), American baseball player and manager
 Red Davis (basketball) (born 1932), American basketball player
 Red Davis (American football) (1907–1988), American football player
 Red Dawson (1906–1983), American football coach
 Forrest DeBernardi (1899–1970), American basketball player
 Red Dehnert (1924–1984), American basketball player
 Louis "Red" Deutsch (1890–1983), Ukrainian-American boxer, tavern owner, victim of the Tube Bar prank calls
 Red Donahue (1873–1913), American baseball pitcher
 Red Dunn (1901–1957), American football player
 Red Dutton (1897–1987), Canadian ice hockey player, coach, and executive
 Red Edwards (1904–1981), American football player and coach
 Red Ehret (1868–1940), American baseball pitcher
 Red Faber (1888–1976), American baseball pitcher
 Red Fisher (baseball) (1887–1940), American baseball player
 Red Gerard (born 2000), American snowboarder
 Don Goldstein (born c. 1937–2022), American basketball player
 Red Grange (1903–1991), American football player
 Percy W. Griffiths (1893–1983), American football player, coach, and politician
 Red Hardy (1923–2003), American baseball pitcher
 Red Harris, American football player and coach
 Lloyd Hittle (1924–2012), American baseball pitcher
 Red Holzman (1920–1998), American basketball player and coach
 Red Howard (1900–1973), American football player
 Red Jones (outfielder) (1911–1974), American baseball player 
 Red Jones (umpire) (1905–1987), American baseball umpire in the American League
 Red Jones (American football), college football player
 Red Kelly (1927–2019), Canadian ice hockey player and coach
 Red Kelly (baseball) (1884–1961), American baseball player
 Johnny Kerr (1932–2009), American basketball player, coach, and broadcaster
 Red Klotz (1920–2014), American basketball player and team owner
 Red Kress (1907–1962), American baseball player and coach
 Milton Leathers (1908–2000), American college football player
 Buddy Lively (1925–2015), American baseball pitcher
 Red Long (1876–1929), American baseball pitcher
 Ralph Maddox (1908–1944), American college football player
 Red Martin (1938–2017), American ice hockey player
 Red Matal (1911–2003), American football player and coach
 Red Mihalik (1916–1996), American basketball player and referee, member of the Basketball Hall of Fame
 Red Miller (1927–2017), American football coach
 Red Mitchell (ice hockey) (1912–1984), Canadian ice hockey player
 Red Murray (1884–1958), American baseball player
 Red Murrell (basketball) (1933–2017), American basketball player
 Red O'Connor, American 1920s football player
 Red Pollard (1909–1981), Canadian horse racing jockey
 Red Ramsey (1911–1984), American football player
 Red Rolfe (1908–1969), American baseball player, manager and executive
 Red Ruffing (1905–1986), American baseball pitcher
 Red Sanders (1905–1958), American college football coach
 Red Schoendienst (1923–2018), American baseball player and manager
 Red Shannon (1897–1970), American baseball player)
 Red Shea (1898–1981), American baseball pitcher
 Red Sheridan (1896–1975), American baseball player
 Red Shurtliffe (1907–1986), American football player 
 Red Smith (third baseman) (1890–1966), American baseball player
 Red Smith (catcher) (1892–1970), American baseball player
 Red Smith (shortstop) (1899–1961), American baseball player
 Red Smith (American football/baseball) (1904–1978), American baseball and football player and coach
 Red Smith (American football), American football player
 Red Wilson (1929–2014), American baseball and football player
 Shirley Wilson (1925–2021), American football coach
 Al Wingo (1898–1964), American baseball player

Military 
 Roy Alexander Gano (1902–1971), US Navy vice admiral
 William Hicks Jackson (1835–1903), Confederate general during the American Civil War
 Lawson P. Ramage (1909–1990), US Navy vice-admiral and Medal of Honor recipient
 Eugene Tobin (1917–1941), American World War II Royal Air Force fighter pilot
 Leonard F. Wing (1893–1945), US Army major and general politician

Politics 
 Red Berry (Texas politician) (1899–1969), American politician and gambler
 H. A. Boucher (1921–2009), American politician
 Ken Livingstone (born 1945), English politician
 Leonard F. Wing (1893–1945), American politician and US Army major general

Media 
 Red Barber (1908–1992), American sportscaster
 Charles "Red" Donley (1923–1998), American sports and news anchor
 Red Fisher (sportsman) (1914–2006), American sporting goods retailer, newspaper columnist, and television personality in Canada
 Red Fisher (journalist) (1926–2018), Canadian sports columnist
 Red Rush (1927–2009), American sportscaster
 Red Smith (sportswriter) (1905–1982), American sportswriter

Other 
 Red Adair (1915–2004), American oil field firefighter
 James "Red" Duke (1928–2015), American trauma surgeon
 Red McCombs (1927–2023), American businessman
 Red Dillard Morrison (1919–1989), American mob boss
 Lynton Wilson (born 1940), Canadian business executive
 Red Legs Greaves, British pirate fugitive whose existence is disputed

See also 
 Danny Lopez (boxer) (born 1952), American boxer nicknamed "Little Red", Ernie Lopez's younger brother
 Ernie Lopez (1945–2009), American boxer nicknamed "Indian Red"
 List of people known as the Red
 Read (surname)
 Redd (given name)
 Redd (surname)
 Steve Smith (comedian) (born 1945), Canadian actor and comedian who performs as "Red Green"

Lists of people by nickname